"Magic in the Air" is a 2014 single by Ivorian musical group Magic System, featuring Moroccan singer Chawki and produced by Moroccan producer RedOne. The track also appears on Magic system's album Africainement vôtre, released on 19 May 2014.

Content
The association football themed song focusing on African football was produced by Swedish-Moroccan producer RedOne with the catchy refrain saying

On t'invite à la magie, y a pas de raccourci, Oublie tes soucis, viens faire la folieFeel the magic in the air, allez allez allez, Levez les mains en l'air, allez allez allez. which translates as "We invite you to the magic, and there are no shortcuts /  Forget your worries, and come and join the madness / Feel the magic in the air, go on, go on, go on / Raise your hands in the air, go on, go on, go on".

The song was released in March 2014 to coincide with preparations for the 2014 FIFA World Cup scheduled for 12 June to 13 July of the same year. Despite the English title of the song, its lyrics are almost entirely in French.

The single became a commercial hit in France and Belgium, earning significant airplay in stadiums during football matches.

It was played every time France scored a goal at the 2018 FIFA World Cup, which saw them win the whole tournament.

The song was sampled from Khaled's song C'est La Vie.

Music video
A music video was also shot and released online on Magic System official YouTube account on 17 March 2014.

UNESCO literacy initiative
As part of its literacy initiative, UNESCO launched a campaign for celebrity signing of FIFA-sanctioned footballs to be used in the 2014 World Cup. Many celebrities from the sports world, artists and politicians signed various balls to be sold in public auction between 4 and 14 June 2014, with all the proceeds from selling of these signed balls going to the alphabetization programme of the organization.

A promotional music video was also made in promoting the charity initiative with various participants signing the balls or playing football or symbolically "passing the ball" to other participants who would sign in their turn. Magic System official website posted direct links to individual signed balls to help in bidding for them.

The celebrities taking part included: 
Sports players / coaches: Javier Pastore, David Luiz, Yaya Touré, Olivier Giroud, Marion Bartoli, Clément Grenier, Brandao, Bacary Sagna, Arsène Wenger, Amaury Leveaux, Adrien Rabiot, Bafétimbi Gomis, Laurent Koscielny, Jérôme Alonzo, Gaëtane Thiney, Florent Malouda, Eric Carrière, Patrick Vieira, Olivier Missoup, Olivier Dacourt, Robert Pires, Rio Mavuba, Raymond Domenech, Sylvain Wiltord, Luis Fernandez
Music artists: M Pokora, Soprano, Youssoupha, Zaho 
Media personalities and sportswriters / hosts: Astrid Bard, Sébastien Cauet, Cyril Hanouna, Nathalie Iannetta, Isabelle Ithurburu, Pierre Ménès, Patrick Sébastien, Darren Tulett
Others: Arnaud "Séan" Garnier

"Asalfo" (Salif Traoré) of Magic System is an Ambassador of Goodwill for UNESCO's literacy programme.

Charts

Weekly charts

Year-end charts

References

2014 singles
Magic System songs
Ahmed Chawki songs
French-language songs
Song recordings produced by RedOne
2014 songs
Parlophone singles
Warner Music Group singles